Charles Ames Memorial City Park is a  park in Gladstone, Oregon, United States.

References

External links

 Charles Ames Memorial Park at Travel Oregon
 Charles Ames Memorial Park Trailhead at Oregon Hikers

Gladstone, Oregon
Parks in Clackamas County, Oregon